Carolina Rebellion was a rock festival that took place annually in North Carolina. It was produced by AEG Live and Danny Wimmer Presents. The inaugural festival took place at the Metrolina Expo in Charlotte, North Carolina. The second year of the festival it was relocated to Rockingham Speedway in Rockingham, North Carolina. The festival took place at Rock City Campgrounds at Charlotte Motor Speedway in Concord, North Carolina in 2013 and the promoters aimed to make that the permanent venue. In 2013, Carolina Rebellion expanded to two days and to three days in 2016. Due to a split between DWP and AEG Live, a new festival, Epicenter, was announced on November 28, 2018 to be the replacement for Carolina Rebellion, scheduled to start in 2019. Epicenter is currently held in Concord, North Carolina.

2011 

May 7

Monster Carolina Stage
 Avenged Sevenfold (headliner)
 Three Days Grace
 Seether
 Bullet for My Valentine
 Skillet
 Halestorm
 Cavo

Monster Rebellion Stage
 Godsmack (co-headliner)
 Stone Sour
 Theory of a Deadman
 Alter Bridge
 Hinder
 Saving Abel
 My Darkest Days

Jägermeister stage
 Rev Theory
 Black Stone Cherry
 Pop Evil
 Art of Dying
 Drop D

2012 

Monster Carolina Stage
 Shinedown (headliner)
 Evanescence
 Five Finger Death Punch
 Chevelle
 Halestorm
 Paper Tongues

Monster Rebellion Stage
 Korn (co-headliner)
 Staind
 Slash featuring Myles Kennedy & The Conspirators
 Volbeat
 Adelitas Way
 Weaving the Fate

Jägermeister Stage
 P.O.D.
 Redlight King
 Red
 New Medicine
 Ghosts of August

2013 

Day 1, Saturday May 4

Monster Energy Carolina Stage
 Alice in Chains (headliner)
 Deftones
 Papa Roach
 Halestorm
 In This Moment
 Otherwise

Monster Energy Rebellion Stage
 Limp Bizkit (co-headliner)
 Three Days Grace
 Bullet for My Valentine
 Asking Alexandria
 Sick Puppies
 Young Guns

Jägermeister Stage
 Device
 Aranda
 MonstrO
 3 Quarters Dead

Day 2, Sunday May 5

Monster Energy Carolina Stage
 Soundgarden (canceled)
 Rise Against (canceled)
 Volbeat (canceled)
 Hollywood Undead
 All That Remains
 Nonpoint (canceled)

Monster Energy Rebellion Stage
 Bush (canceled)
 3 Doors Down (canceled)
 Buckcherry
 Steel Panther
 Sevendust
 Pop Evil

Jägermeister Stage
 Escape the Fate
 Red Line Chemistry
 Heaven's Basement
 American Fangs

2014 

Day 1, Saturday May 3

Monster Energy Carolina Stage
 Avenged Sevenfold (headliner)
 Volbeat
 Anthrax (replacement for Motörhead)
 Black Label Society
 Adelitas Way

Monster Energy Rebellion Stage
 Rob Zombie (co-headliner)
 Seether
 Killswitch Engage
 Black Stone Cherry
 Trivium

Jägermeister Stage 
 Fozzy
 Thousand Foot Krutch
 Kyng
 Devour the Day
 Truckfighters

Day 2, Sunday May 4

Monster Energy Carolina Stage
 Kid Rock (headliner)
 311
 A Day to Remember
 Theory of a Deadman
 Hellyeah

Monster Energy Rebellion Stage
 Five Finger Death Punch (co-headliner)
 Staind
 Alter Bridge
 Fuel
 Nothing More

Jägermeister Stage
 Memphis May Fire (replacement for Of Mice & Men)
 Redlight King
 Twelve Foot Ninja
 Gemini Syndrome

2015 

Day 1, May 2
Monster Energy Carolina Stage
 Marilyn Manson (co-headliner)
 Rise Against
 Chevelle
 Scott Weiland & The Wildabouts
 Nonpoint

Monster Energy Rebellion Stage
 Korn (headliner)
 Sammy Hagar & The Circle
 Papa Roach
 Hollywood Undead (replacement for Bush)
 Of Mice & Men
 We Are Harlot

ReverbNation Stage
 Cheap Trick
 Jackyl
 Stars In Stereo
 Islander
 ReverbNation Band

Jägermeister Stage
 Motionless in White
 Periphery
 Beartooth
 Sons of Texas
 Lola Black

Day 2, May 3

Monster Energy Carolina Stage
 Godsmack (co-headliner)
 Slash featuring Myles Kennedy & The Conspirators
 Halestorm
 In This Moment
 Young Guns

Monster Energy Rebellion Stage
 Slipknot (headliner)
 Slayer
 Breaking Benjamin
 The Pretty Reckless
 Butcher Babies

ReverbNation Stage
 Queensrÿche
 Suicidal Tendencies
 Testament
 Exodus

Jägermeister Stage
 In Flames
 Tremonti
 Hatebreed
 Starset

2016 

Day 1, Friday May 6

Monster Energy Carolina Stage
 Lynyrd Skynyrd (co-headliner)
 Sixx:A.M.
 Pop Evil
 Black Stone Cherry
 Sick Puppies

Monster Energy Rebellion Stage
 Scorpions (headliner)
 3 Doors Down
 Hellyeah
 Avatar
 Lacey Sturm
 Aranda

Black Stage
 Collective Soul
 Filter
 Candlebox
 Big Jesus
 The Glorious Sons

Gold Stage
 Between the Buried and Me
 Escape the Fate
 New Years Day
 From Ashes to New
 Stitched Up Heart

Day 2, Saturday May 7

Monster Energy Carolina Stage
 Five Finger Death Punch (co-headliner)
 Megadeth
 Anthrax
 P.O.D.
 Saint Asonia

Monster Energy Rebellion Stage
 Shinedown (headliner)
 A Day to Remember
 Bullet for My Valentine
 Sevendust
 Trivium
 Red Sun Rising

Black Stage
 Lamb Of God
 Ghost
 Parkway Drive
 Audiotopsy
 Andrew Watt
 Monster Truck

Gold Stage
 Clutch
 The Sword
 Texas Hippie Coalition
 Wilson
 Cane Hill

Day 3, Saturday May 8

Monster Energy Carolina Stage
 Rob Zombie (co-headliner)
 Deftones
 Cypress Hill
 Yelawolf
 Thousand Foot Krutch

Monster Energy Rebellion Stage
 Disturbed (headliner)
 Bring Me the Horizon
 Pennywise
 The Struts
 Hands Like Houses

Black Stage
 Alice Cooper
 Babymetal
 Enter Shikari
 Royal Thunder
 The Shrine

Gold Stage
 Asking Alexandria
 August Burns Red
 Code Orange
 Unlocking the Truth
 '68

2017 

Day 1, Friday May 5

Monster Energy Carolina Stage
 Soundgarden (headliner)
 Mastodon
 Pierce the Veil
 Of Mice & Men
 The Dillinger Escape Plan
 Black Map

Monster Energy Rebellion Stage
 A Perfect Circle (co-headliner)
 The Cult
 Highly Suspect
 Eagles of Death Metal
 Starset

Black Stage
 Opeth
 Amon Amarth
 Volumes
 Wage War
 As Lions

Gold Stage
 Gojira
 Every Time I Die
 Radkey
 Dorothy
 Mother Feather

Day 2, Saturday May 6

Monster Energy Carolina Stage
 Def Leppard (headliner)
 Tesla
 Alter Bridge
 Rival Sons
 All That Remains
 I Prevail

Monster Energy Rebellion Stage
 Korn (co-headliner)
 Chevelle
 The Pretty Reckless
 In This Moment
 Nothing More
 Aeges

Black Stage
 Sum 41
 Machine Gun Kelly
 Dinosaur Pile-Up
 Royal Republic
 Ded

Gold Stage
 In Flames
 The Amity Affliction
 Frank Carter & The Rattlesnakes
 Badflower
 Cover Your Tracks

Day 3, Sunday May 7

Monster Energy Carolina Stage
 Avenged Sevenfold (headliner)
 Volbeat
 Three Days Grace
 Skillet
 Beartooth

Monster Energy Rebellion Stage
 The Offspring (co-headliner)
 Papa Roach
 Seether
 Motionless in White
 Kyng

Black Stage
 Coheed and Cambria
 Taking Back Sunday
 Sylar
 Citizen Zero

Gold Stage
 Falling in Reverse
 Fozzy
 Fire From the Gods
 Goodbye June
 The Charm The Fury

2018 

Day 1, Friday May 4

Monster Energy Carolina Stage
Alice in Chains (headliner)
Stone Sour
Bullet For My Valentine
Pop Evil
Red Sun Rising

Monster Energy Rebellion Stage
Shinedown (co-headliner)
Stone Temple Pilots
Parkway Drive
Sevendust
Avatar

Black Stage
Underoath
Tremonti
Power Trip
He Is Legend
Dube

Gold Stage
Andrew W.K.
Texas Hippie Coalition
Stick to Your Guns
Counterfeit.
The Wild!

Day 2, Saturday May 5

Monster Energy Carolina Stage
Godsmack (headliner)
Breaking Benjamin
In This Moment
Trivium
Shaman's Harvest

Monster Energy Rebellion Stage
Five Finger Death Punch (co-headliner)
Halestorm
Black Veil Brides
Asking Alexandria
From Ashes to New

Black Stage
The Used
Butcher Babies
New Years Day
Them Evils
Palaye Royale
Big Story

Gold Stage
Hatebreed
Emmure
Joyous Wolf
Toothgrinder
Bad Wolves
Palisades

Day 3, Sunday May 6

Monster Energy Carolina Stage
Muse (headliner)
Incubus
The Struts
Greta Van Fleet
The Bronx

Monster Energy Rebellion Stage
Queens of the Stone Age (co-headliner)
Billy Idol
Clutch
Thrice
Quicksand

Black Stage
Baroness
The Sword
Code Orange
JellyRoll
Spirit Animal

Gold Stage
Red Fang
The Fever 333
The Blue Stones
Mutoid Man
Cane Hill

References 

Heavy metal festivals in the United States
Music festivals in North Carolina
Rock festivals in the United States